Bisher Al-Khasawneh (born 27 January 1969) is a Jordanian politician and diplomat who is serving as the 43rd Prime Minister of Jordan and Minister of Defence since 12 October 2020. 

Al-Khasawneh was an ambassador of Jordan to Egypt, France, Kenya, Ethiopia, African Union, League of Arab States,  and to UNESCO. He also served as Coordinator General and Director of the Peace Process and Negotiations Bureau in Jordan. He served as Minister of State for Foreign Affairs between 2016 and 2017. He subsequently was Minister of State for Legal Affairs between 2017 and 2018. He served as the adviser to King Abdullah II for Communication and Coordination at The Royal Hashemite Court between April 2019 and August 2020. Until his appointment as Prime Ministerm Al-Khasawneh served as the adviser to the King for policies.

Life and career
Al-Khasawneh's father Hani was a leader of the Ba'ath Party. He studied at the School of Oriental and African Studies and then obtained a doctorate in law from the London School of Economics and Political Science. His doctoral thesis, dated 2007, was titled "An appraisal of the right of return and compensation of Jordanian nationals of Palestinian refugee origin and Jordan's right, under international law, to bring claims relating thereto, on their behalf to and against Israel and to seek compensation as a host state in light of the conclusion of the Jordan-Israel peace treaty of 1994". From June 2012 until September 2016, Khasawneh served as Jordanian ambassador to Egypt.

On 28 September 2016 he was named Minister of State for Foreign Affairs in Hani Mulki's cabinet. On 15 January 2017 he was named Minister of State for Legal Affairs in a cabinet reshuffle by Prime Minister Hani Mulki. Al-Khasawneh was sworn in as Jordan's Ambassador to France on 31 August 2018.

On 23 April 2019 he was named adviser for Communication and Coordination to King Abdullah II in The Royal Hashemite Court. On 18 August 2020 he was named as adviser to the king for policies.

Upon his appointment as Prime Minister on 8 October 2020 King Abdullah II instructed him to improve the capabilities of the state in the COVID-19 pandemic in Jordan. He was also tasked with overseeing the November 2020 parliamentary elections. His cabinet, in which he also serves as Minister of Defence, was sworn in on 12 October 2020. Al-Khasawneh stated he wanted to overhaul the Jordan economy, while focusing on developing a public safety net and planning a realistic government budget. Al-Khasawneh declared in a speech to the Jordan parliament in January 2021 that Jordan would receive 1 million doses of COVID-19 vaccine from BioNTech/Pfizer and 2 million doses from the COVAX initiative led by the Global Alliance for Vaccines and Immunization (GAVI), the World Health Organization (WHO), and the Coalition for Epidemic Preparedness Innovations (CEPI).

Education
 Bachelor degree in Law from University of Jordan.
 Executive Diploma in counter-radicalization and counter-terrorism from National Defense University.
 Executive Diploma in Public Policies from John F. Kennedy School of Government at Harvard University.
 Master degree in International Affaires, Diplomacy and Economics from SOAS, University of London.
 Master of Laws in International Law and Ph.D in Law from the London School of Economics and Political Science.

Positions
 President of the Legal Committee Council of Ministers of Jordan.
 Member of Economic Development and Services and Social Affairs Committees Council of Ministers of Jordan.
 Part time Lecturer at the Faculty of Law at the University of Jordan and Jordanian Institute of Diplomacy.
 Director General of Jordan Information Centre.
 Advisor at the Prime Ministry of Jordan at the Bureau of Legislation at the Prime Ministry.

Awards
 Order of the Star of Jordan (Third Class).
 Order of Independence (First and Second Class).

See also 

 Bisher Al-Khasawneh's Cabinet

References

External links

 Prime Ministry (in Arabic)

1969 births
Living people
Ambassadors of Jordan to France
Ambassadors of Jordan to Egypt
Ambassadors of Jordan to Kenya
Ambassadors of Jordan to Ethiopia
Alumni of the London School of Economics
Defence ministers of Jordan
Prime Ministers of Jordan